The 2014–15 Tunisian Ligue Professionnelle 1 (Tunisian Professional League) season was the 89th season of top-tier football in Tunisia. The competition began on 13 August 2014 and ended on 2 June 2015. The defending champions from the previous season are Espérance de Tunis.

Teams
A total of 16 teams will contest the league, including 13 sides from the 2013–14 season and three promoted from the 2013–14 Tunisian Ligue Professionnelle 2.
AS Djerba was the first to obtain promotion, followed by AS Gabès and finally ES Zarzis one game before the end of the promotion group league. The three teams made their comeback to the Tunisian Ligue Professionnelle 1 after finishing in the 3 first places of the six-team promotion group.
On the other hand, Olympique Béja, LPS Tozeur and Grombalia Sports were the 3 last teams of the 2013-14 season and will play in the Tunisian Ligue Professionnelle 2 during the 2014-15 season. Espérance Sportive de Tunis are the defending champions from the 2013-14 season.

Stadiums and locations

Results

League table

Result table

Leaders

Goalscorers

Top goalscorers

All goalscorers

15 goals

  Saber Khalifa

11 goals

  Baghdad Bounedjah
  Youssef Mouihbi

10 goals

  Ahmed Akaïchi

9 goals

  Chaker Rguii

8 goals

  Abdelmoumene Djabou
  Tijani Belaïd

7 goals

  Slim Mezlini
  Emem Eduok

6 goals

  Mohamed Cheikh Touré
  Jacques Bessan
  Hugues-Wilfried Dah
  Yannick N'Djeng
  Ismail Diakité
  Hedi Boukhriss
  Hichem Essifi
  Slim Jedaïed
  Mejdi Mosrati
  Heithem Ben Salem
  Oussama Darragi
  Bilel Ben Messaoud
  Mohamed Amine Aouichaoui

5 goals

  Zouheir Dhaouadi
  Fakhreddine Ben Youssef
  Brahim El Bahri
  Borhene Ghannem
  Alaeddine Marzouki
  Maher Hannachi
  Khaled Yahia
  Youssef Fouzai
  Foued Khraïfi
  Bilel Yaken
  Zied Ounalli
  Ashante Uriah

4 goals

  Mohamed Ali Moncer
  Alaeddine Abbès
  Mohamed Ali Ben Hammouda
  Zied Boughattas
  Karim Aouadhi
  Didier Lebri
  Edem Rjaïbi
  Mohamed Aouichi
  Ahmed Hosni
  Saad Bguir
  Salema Kasdaoui
  Haythem Jouini
  Amir Omrani

3 goals

  Imed Meniaoui
  Didier Talla
  Ali Maâloul
  Taha Yassine Khenissi
  Hamza Hadda
  Wael Ben Romdhane
  Babacar Ndiour
  Mehdi Saada
  Zied Bakouch
  Younes Mazhoud
  Rami Bedoui
  Hassen Harbaoui
  Skander Cheikh
  Zouheir Attia
  Alkhali Bangoura
  Alaya Brigui
  Malek Landolsi

2 goals

  Seif Tka
  Chiheb Zoghlami
  Harrison Afful
  Yassine Meriah
  Chamseddine Dhaouadi
  Slim Mhadhebi
  Amine Abbès
  Ali Mchani
  Mathieu Bandiaky
  Junior Karamoko
  Aymen Ben Amor
  Elyès Jlassi
  Maher Ameur
  Amor Fhal
  Fakhreddine Galbi
  Aboubacar Tambadou
  Mickaël Buscher
  Wajdi Mejri
  Najeh Hamadi
  Larbi Jabeur
  Boulbaba Ghrab
  Ahmed Zuway
  Akram Ben Sassi
  Mohamed Abdeddeyem
  Oussema Abdelkader
  Fahmi Ben Romdhane
  Zoubeir Darragi
  Ahmed Ayadi
  Idriss Mhirsi
  Mossaab Sassi
  Achref Nasri
  Rochdi Jarbouii
  Heithem Mhamedi
  Fehmi Kacem
  Sofiane Moussa
  Ghailene Chaalali
  Mohamed Ali Yacoubi
  Selim Bacha
  Charfeddine Belhaj
  Youssef Trabelsi
  Bassem Nafti

1 goal

  Yassin Mikari
  Hamza Agrebi
  Stéphane Nater
  Bilel Ifa
  Nidhal Said
  Imed Louati
  Seifallah Hosni
  Saïf Ghezal
  Nabil Missaoui
  Hamza Zakar
  Laamari Bargougui
  Ghazi Chellouf
  Omar Zekri
  Zied Ziadi
  Baligh El Echi
  Kaddour Beldjilali
  Mohamed Yakouba
  Franck Kom
  Ernest Thierry Anang
  Onuoha Ogbonna
  Ibrahima Touré
  Youssoupha Mbengue
  Fousseny Coulibaly
  Magno Cruz
  Alex Somian
  Abdul Moustapha Ouédraogo
  Chedly Ghrab
  Hachem Abbès
  Achref Ben Dhiaf
  Hamdi Rouid
  Haythem Baghdadi
  Tarek Chaabouni
  Amir Ben Mchala
  Mehdi Ressaïssi
  Houssine Ben Yahia
  Mahmoud Dridi
  Malek Bhar
  Mohamed Ayed
  Zied Derbali
  Mohamed Jemaa Khlif
  Mahmoud Khemiri
  Naoufel Youssfi
  Mohamed Habib Yaken
  Hamdi Abdi
  Fedi Hmizi
  Hocine Ragued
  Houssem Taboubi
  Chakib Lachkham
  Zied Machmoum
  Heythem Doula
  Mortadha Baadeche
  Youssef Khemiri
  Marouane Tej
  Marouane Atoui
  Aymen Derouiche
  Abdelkader Dhaou
  Mohamed Houssem Slimène
  Slimène Kchok
  Mohamed Ali Ragoubi
  Yassine Salhi
  Mohamed Ali Slema
  Iheb Mbarki
  Houssem Bnina
  Mohamed Ali Jouini
  Rami Bouchniba
  Omar Saddi
  Mehdi Ouertani
  Alaeddine Bouslimi
  Seifeddine Jerbi
  Maher Abidi
  Mohamed Amine Naffati
  Hamdi Nagguez
  Wissem Bousnina
  Mohamed Ali Korbi
  Houcine Messaadi
  Anis Farhat
  Mahmoud Laadhibi
  Firas Aissaoui
  Hamza Lahmar

Own goals
  Hicham Belkaroui (Club Africain) against AS Djerba on 31 August 2014
  Mohamed Amine Naffati (CS Hammam-Lif) against Stade Tunisien on 31 August 2014
  Khalil Hnid (AS Marsa) against Club Africain on 3 October 2014
  Alex Somian (Stade Tunisien) against CS Sfaxien on 28 December 2014
  Mohamed Ben Ali (Stade Tunisien) against Club Africain on 18 February 2015
  Mehdi Ben Nsib (AS Djerba) against CS Sfaxien on 18 February 2015
  Houssem Bnina (JS Kairouan) against ES Zarzis on 28 February 2015

See also
2014–15 Tunisian Ligue Professionnelle 2
2014–15 Tunisian Ligue Professionnelle 3
2014–15 Tunisian Cup

References

External links
 2014–15 Ligue 1 on RSSSF.com

Tun
2014-15
1